Thyatirina is a monotypic moth genus of the family Noctuidae erected by George Hampson in 1910. Its only species, Thyatirina achatina, was first described by Weymer in 1896. It is found in Zaire, Kenya, Tanzania, Mozambique, Zimbabwe, Zambia, South Africa, the Democratic Republic of the Congo and Malawi.

References

Acontiinae
Monotypic moth genera